Heliamphora 'Red Mambo' is a cultivar of Heliamphora registered by Francois Boulianne from Canada.

This cultivar is very different from other Heliamphora; the nectar spoon is horned.

The origin of the plant is a total mystery. Heliamphora 'Red Mambo' was found in an old private collection in Montréal Canada, half dead. At that point, the plant was probably the only one in the world.

References

Heliamphora
Ornamental plant cultivars